Sarnawan is an Indian Punjabi language serial telecast on Zee Punjabi TV Channel. The 52 episodes serial based on short stories was produced by Pramod Pabbi and Kamlesh Sharma and directed by Ravi Deep. The title song written by Surjit Paatar and composed by Kanwar Iqbal was sung by Brijesh Ahuja

Stories 
Most of the stories presented in the TV Serial Sarnawan were the works of Punjabi writers. However few stories by Hindi and foreign writers were also adapted for television. Some of the stories were adapted for television by Ravi Deep, Navnindra Behl and Kirpal Kazakh. The stories included:
 Chod Chanan by Nanak Singh
 Atthara Ghoda by Kapur Singh Ghuman
 Rabb jhooth Na Bulaye
 Saggi Phul by Gurdial Singh
 Gadal by Rangeya Raghav
 The Invisible Wound by Karoly Kisfaludy
 A Retrieved Reformation by O. Henry
 Zeher Play by Pali Bhupinder Singh
 Sirjana Play by Pali Bhupinder Singh

Television shows set in Punjab, India
Indian anthology television series